Damon Ieremia Salesa (born 30 December 1972) is a New Zealand academic. Of Samoan descent, he is the first Pacific person to hold the position of vice-chancellor at a New Zealand university.

Education 
Raised in Glen Innes, Salesa attended Selwyn College and then the University of Auckland. He graduated in 1997 with a master's of arts and the title of his thesis was "Troublesome half-castes" : tales of a Samoan borderland. Salesa was the first Rhodes Scholar of Pacific descent, obtaining his PhD from the University of Oxford. The title of his doctoral thesis was Race mixing: a Victorian problem in Britain and New Zealand, 1830s–1870.

Academic career 
He was an associate professor of history at the University of Michigan, before returning to Auckland where he has been co-head of Te Wānanga o Waipapa (School of Māori Studies and Pacific Studies) and pro vice-chancellor (Pacific) at the University of Auckland. 

Salesa is a Fellow of the Royal Society Te Apārangi. 

In 2017, Salesa attracted significant press both with claims that Auckland has "residential segregation", and that Pacific Island sports stars are denied governance roles.

In November 2021, Salesa was appointed as Vice-Chancellor of Auckland University of Technology (AUT). In late October 2022, Salesa confirmed that AUT was proceeding with plans to make 250 full-time staff including 170 academic staff redundant. In justifying the redundancies, Salesa cited rising salary costs, declining government funding, and a projected decline in the number of student enrollments for 2023. In response, the Tertiary Education Union announced that it would take legal action against AUT in an attempt to halt the 170 academic staff redundancies.  In early January 2023, the Employment Relations Authority (ERA) ruled that AUT had violated its collective employment agreement with academic staff and ordered the University to rescind the 170 severance notices it had issued in December 2022.

Awards 
In 2021, Salesa was elected a Fellow of the Royal Society Te Apārangi, in recognition of "his outstanding interdisciplinary contribution to Pacific Studies".

Personal life 
Salesa is married to Jenny Salesa, a lawyer and member of the New Zealand parliament for the Labour Party. They have two children.

Selected works 
 Racial Crossings: Race, Intermarriage, and the Victorian British Empire. 2012. . (Won the Ernest Scott Prize for History.)
Island time : New Zealand's Pacific futures. 2017. ISBN 978-1-98-853353-7

References

External links
 Google scholar 
 Institutional homepage
 @DamonSalesa on twitter

1972 births
Living people
New Zealand people of Samoan descent
Samoan academics
Historians of the British Empire
21st-century New Zealand historians
University of Auckland alumni
Academic staff of the University of Auckland
Alumni of Oriel College, Oxford
Place of birth missing (living people)
New Zealand Rhodes Scholars
People educated at Selwyn College, Auckland
Fellows of the Royal Society of New Zealand
University of Michigan faculty
Academic staff of the Auckland University of Technology